No Blood Spilled is a novel by Les Daniels published by TOR in 1991, and by Raven in 1996.

Plot summary
No Blood Spilled is the second part of the adventures of vampire Sebastian Newcastle, in which he is pursued from England to colonial India by his bitter enemy Reginald Callender, who will not rest until the vampire is destroyed.

Reception
Gideon Kibblewhite reviewed No Blood Spilled for Arcane magazine, rating it a 4 out of 10 overall. Kibblewhite comments that "Enjoyable this may be, but it certainly isn't very creepy, and if Daniels intended it to be light-hearted it doesn't make up for the rather cheesy ending. It spirals into a Holmes-versus-Moriarty affair that makes   pleasant, but on the whole, unremarkable entertainment."

Reviews
Review by Algis Budrys (1991) in The Magazine of Fantasy & Science Fiction, July 1991

References

1991 American novels
Tor Books books